José Alberto Barreto (born 22 February 2000) is an Argentine professional footballer who plays as a forward for Patronato.

Career
Barreto's career started with Patronato. Mario Sciacqua promoted the forward into the club's first-team squad during the 2018–19 season in the Primera División, with Barreto making his first professional appearance on 22 February 2019 - his nineteenth birthday - in a 2–1 loss away to Tigre.

Career statistics
.

References

External links

2000 births
Living people
Sportspeople from Entre Ríos Province
Argentine footballers
Association football forwards
Club Atlético Patronato footballers
CSyD Tristán Suárez footballers
Argentine Primera División players
Primera Nacional players